Niklas Weißenberger (born 13 May 1993) is German football defender who currently plays for Sportfreunde Dorfmerkingen.

Honours 
Würzburger Kickers
Winner
 Bavarian Cup: 2013–14

References

External links 
 

1993 births
Living people
German footballers
Würzburger Kickers players
3. Liga players
Association football defenders
Sportspeople from Würzburg
Footballers from Bavaria